The Grasshopper is a 1970 drama film directed by Jerry Paris. It stars Jacqueline Bisset, Jim Brown, Joseph Cotten and Christopher Stone. Penny Marshall appears in a small role.

Plot
Christine Adams, a cheerful 19-year-old from British Columbia, Canada, travels to Los Angeles to be with her fiance, who works there in a bank. When the relationship doesn't work out, she moves to Las Vegas.

She finds work as a showgirl and meets Tommy Marcott, an African-American former pro football player who holds an executive position at the casino, though in truth he is only used as a "celebrity greeter." They fall in love and get married, but when Tommy gives a severe beating to a wealthy casino patron who had beaten and raped Christine, they flee Vegas, discussing the possibility that the casino patron will seek revenge. In Los Angeles, Tommy is unable to get a good job and his and Christine's relationship suffers, and then Tommy is shot dead on a basketball court, likely the anticipated act of revenge.

After the funeral, Christine has a bad reaction to illicit drugs she consumes in her grief. She returns to Las Vegas and finds work as a V.I.P. "party girl". In that capacity she meets and is persuaded by wealthy client Richard Morgan to return to Los Angeles and be his mistress.

Christine is fond of Richard but she gets bored in her new life, so she becomes romantically involved with Jay Rigney, who she had previously known platonically. She convinces Jay that she can get enough money that they can buy a ranch together. However that plan is doomed when Richard asks Christine to marry him, wanting her to spend all her time with him.

Jay persuades Christine that the only way they can keep the dream of getting a ranch alive is if she becomes a prostitute and he works as her pimp. She ends her relationship with Richard and for a while things go as they planned. However one night she returns to the apartment she shares with Jay to discover he has left her and taken all of their money.

Christine goes to the airport where Richard’s private plane is kept and, by promising “some fun” and sharing a marijuana joint, induces airfield employee Elroy, who she had previously flirted with, to take her up in a skywriting plane. Still sharing the joint, Christine has Elroy write "FUCK IT" across the sky, to the amusement or consternation of those below. The police take away Christine and Elroy when they land. While being arrested Christine is asked her age, to which she replies, “twenty-two”.

Cast
 Jacqueline Bisset as Christine Adams
 Jim Brown as Tommy Marcott
 Joseph Cotten as Richard Morgan
 Corbett Monica as Danny Raymond
 Christopher Stone as Jay Rigney
 Ramon Bieri as Roosevelt Dekker
 Ed Flanders as Jack Benton
 William Callaway as Elroy
 Roger Garrett as Buck Brown
 William Bassett as Aaron
 Marc Hannibal as Marion Walters

Production
Parts of the film were shot in Heber, Utah.

Bisset later said there "were good bits" in the film. "It could have been interesting. The girl in that film was a female Alfie."

Cultural Reference
Although not officially credited as such, the film's story has broad parallels to Anton Chekhov's 1892 short story of the same name.

Release
The film opened in Chicago and San Francisco in the week ended May 27, 1970.

Home media
The Grasshopper was released March 23, 2009 on DVD by Warner Bros. via the Warner Archive DVD-on-demand service.

Reception
The film grossed $46,000 in its opening week.

See also
 List of American films of 1970
 List of films set in Las Vegas

References

External links

 
 

1970 films
Films set in the Las Vegas Valley
Films directed by Jerry Paris
Films scored by Billy Goldenberg
Films with screenplays by Jerry Belson
Films shot in Utah
1970s English-language films
American drama films
1970s American films